Andreas G. Orphanides is a Cypriot professor and university administrator. He is Professor of History and Archaeology at Philips University in Cyprus, after serving as Professor of History, Archaeology and Anthropology at European University Cyprus, where he was formerly Rector. He is a past president of both the European Association of Institutions in Higher Education and the European Quality Assurance Register of Higher Education.

Life and career

Andreas G. Orphanides was born in Lapithos, Cyprus. He received his undergraduate degree from the School of Philosophy at the University of Athens and pursued his graduate studies in Anthropology and Archeology at State University of New York at Albany. He received his master's degree in 1982 with a dissertation on Bronze Age anthropomorphic figurines in the Cesnola Collection at the Metropolitan Museum of Art, published the following year in Astrom Editions' Studies in Mediterranean Archaeology series. He received his PhD in 1986. His doctoral dissertation, Towards a theory for the interpretation of material remains in archaeology: the Bronze Age anthropomorphic figurines from Cyprus was a continuation of his master's degree research. He was Assistant Director of the Institute of Cypriot Studies at the State University of New York at Albany, as well as Assistant Director and pottery specialist of the University's archaeological expedition in Cyprus (1981-1986).

Orphanides later pursued further graduate studies in open and distance learning at Hellenic Open University. On his return to Cyprus, he taught History, Archaeology and Anthropology at Cyprus College, and eventually became Dean of Academic Affairs there. From 1988 to 2006 he was editor-in-chief of the college's Journal of Business and Society. When the college received university status and became European University Cyprus in 2007, he was elected and appointed Rector, a position he held until 2014, and thereafter he remained Professor of History, Archaeology and Anthropology.

Andreas G. Orphanides was Vice President of the European Association of Institutions in Higher Education from 2005 to 2011, and President from 2011 to 2015, and with these capacities he participated in various bodies of the Bologna Process, such as the BFUG, the E4 Group, and EQAR where he served as its President and Vice President.  Recently (2015-2020), he was on the Council of the Cyprus Agency of Quality Assurance and Accreditation in Higher Education.

Orphanides is also a composer whose works have been performed in Europe and in the United States. He studied both Western classical music and Byzantine music at the National Conservatory and the Kyrenia Diocese School of Byzantine Music at Lapithos. His works include several symphonic and choral pieces, the anthems of the European University Cyprus and the Open University of Cyprus, and the string quartet 'Cyprus Zephyr' which won Second Prize at the 2017 Malta International Composition Competition.

Books
Single-authored
 Andreas G. Orphanides, Bronze Age Anthropomorphic Figurines in the Cesnola Collection at the Metropolitan Museum of Art. SIMA, Pocket-Book 20, Gothenburg: Paul Astroms Forlag, 1983, 88 pages, 6 figures, 18 plates
 Andreas G. Orphanides, Radioanalytical Techniques in Archaeology: Pottery and Raw Clay Analysis. Nicosia: AGO Publications, 1985, 104 pages, 10 figures
 Andreas G. Orphanides, Towards a Theory for the Interpretation of Material Remains in Archaeology: The Bronze Age Anthropomorphic Figurines from Cyprus. Ph.D. Dissertation, State University of New York at Albany, 1986, 233 pages, 30 figures

Co-edited
Andreas G. Orphanides and P. W. Wallace, Greek and Latin Texts to the Third Century A.D, SHC, Volume I, Nicosia: Institute of Cypriot Studies, University at Albany, and Cyprus College, 1990, 312 pages
 Andreas G. Orphanides and P. W. Wallace, Near Eastern and Aegean Texts from the Third to First Millennia B.C. (by A. Bernard Knapp), SHC, Volume II, Albany, NY: Greece and Cyprus Research Center, 1996, 92 pages
Andreas G. Orphanides and P. W. Wallace, A Pilgrim’s Account of Cyprus: Barsky's Travels in Cyprus (by A. D. Grishin), SHC, Volume III, Albany, NY: Greece and Cyprus Research Center, 1996, 114 pages, 18 plates
Andreas G. Orphanides and P. W. Wallace, Pero Tafur and Cyprus (by C. I. Nepaulsingh), SHC, Volume IV, Albany, NY: Greece and Cyprus Research Center, 1997, 70 pages
Andreas G. Orphanides and P. W. Wallace, English Texts: Frankish and Turkish Periods (by D. W. Martin), SHC, Volume V, Albany, NY: Greece and Cyprus Research Center, 1998, 336 pages
 Andreas G. Orphanides and P. W. Wallace English Texts: British Period to 1900 (by D. W. Martin), SHC, Volume VI, Albany, NY: Greece and Cyprus Research Center, 1999, 352 pages, 55 plates
Andreas G. Orphanides and P. W. Wallace, Greek Texts of the Fourth to Thirteenth Centuries (by H. A. Pohlsander), SHC, Volume VII, Albany, NY: Greece and Cyprus Research Center, 1999, 217 pages
Andreas G. Orphanides and P. W. Wallace, Latin Texts from the First Century B.C. to the Seventeenth Century A.D. (by L. Roberts), SHC, Volume VIII, Albany, NY: Greece and Cyprus Research Center, 2000, 272 pages
Andreas G. Orphanides and P. W. Wallace, The Final Days of British Rule in Cyprus (by D. W. Martin et P. W. Wallace.), SHC, Volume IX, Albany, NY: Greece and Cyprus Research Center, 2000, 370 pages
Andreas G. Orphanides and P. W. Wallace, Lusignan's Chronography and Brief General History of the Island of Cyprus A.D. 1573 (by O. Pelosi), SHC, Volume X, Albany, NY: Greece and Cyprus Research Center, 2001, 252 pages
 Andreas G. Orphanides and P. W. Wallace, Enosis and the British (by R. Coughlan), SHC, Volume XI, Albany, NY: Greece and Cyprus Research Center, 2004, 252 pages
 Andreas G. Orphanides and P. W. Wallace, German Texts: Turkish Period after 1800 (by H. A. Polhsander), SHC, Volume XII, Albany, NY: Greece and Cyprus Research Center, 2006, 302 pages
Andreas G. Orphanides and P. W. Wallace, George Boustronios, A Narrative of the Chronicle of Cyprus 1456-1489 (translated by N. Coureas and H. Polhsander), SHC, Volume XIII, Albany, NY: Greece and Cyprus Research Center, 2005, 252 pages
Andreas G. Orphanides and P. W. Wallace, Swedish Texts (by Elisabeth Piltz), SHC, Volume XIV, Albany, NY: Greece and Cyprus Research Center, 2007, 121 pages, 3 plates

Awards and honours
Gold Medal of the Ministry of Education and Science of the Republic of Armenia "for his significant contribution to the field of Education and Science, and for his support to modernization of programs of Universities of the Republic of Armenia", 2014 
 Doctor Honoris Causa awarded by the Senate of Ovidius University, 2012 
 Second Prize awarded for his string quartet Cyprus Zephyr, Malta International Composition Competition, 2017

Musical compositions
 Composed "String Quartet "Cyprus Zephyr"", 2017 
 Composed "Saxophone Quartet "Cyprus Zephyr"", 2017 
 Musical CD "Orphanides Meets Kapp–EURASHE 20th Anniversary Gala Concert, Tallinn", 2011
 Composed "Δοξάστε-Γιορτάστε" (for orchestra and choir), 2008
 Composed "Symphonic Poem "Anerada" for Piano and Orchestra", 2006 
 Composed "Symphonic Suite in F major "Κοινές Ρίζες" (for symphony orchestra), 2005
 Composed and wrote the libretto of "Symphony in D minor "Olympic Legacy"" (for symphony orchestra, choir and soloist-baritone), 2005
 Composed and wrote the lyrics of CD "Φυλλοκάρκια [Heart Leaves]" (13 songs), Nicosia, Aria Music Records, 2004  (donated to charity)
 Wrote the lyrics of Popular Oratorio - CD "Νησί του Έρωτα [Island of Love]" (12 songs), Athens, 2000 
 Composed and wrote the lyrics of the Anthems of two universities. i.e. Open University of Cyprus  and European University Cyprus, 2006

References

Living people
Greek Cypriot people
Academic staff of European University Cyprus
Cypriot composers
Male composers
1955 births
Heads of universities and colleges in Cyprus